Brazilian schools may refer to:

 Education in Brazil
 Brazilian schools in Japan